Neelesh Awasthi is an Indian politician and a member of the Indian National Congress party.

Political career
He became an MLA in 2013.

Personal life
He did his schooling from the St. Aloysius Senior Secondary School in Jabalpur and is married to Surbhi Awasthi.

See also
Madhya Pradesh Legislative Assembly
2013 Madhya Pradesh Legislative Assembly election

References

External links

1974 births
Living people
Indian National Congress politicians from Madhya Pradesh
Madhya Pradesh MLAs 2013–2018